Joyee Setu or Joyee Bridge is the longest road river bridge of West Bengal which connects Haldibari and Mekhliganj town of Mekhliganj Sub-division in Cooch Behar District of West Bengal. The bridge was opened on 1 February 2021. The bridge is about 3.8 km long and crosses the Teesta River. Currently, it is the longest river bridge of West Bengal. By the opening of this bridge, the distance between Haldibari and Mekhliganj has been drastically reduced to 15 km from the pre-existing road length of 70 km.

Connection 
The bridge connects the Haldibari Town and Mekhliganj Town, and also connects Haldibari Town With Cooch Behar Town bypassing Jalpaiguri Town.

Foundation & construction 
The Executing Authority of Joyee Setu was The Executive Engineer of Teesta Bridge construction Division Public Works Department. The bridge was constructed by SP Singla Constructions Pvt. Ltd.  In August 2015, Chief Minister Mamata Banerjee had laid the foundation of the bridge. On 1 February 2021 the bridge was opened. The bridge is constructed and maintained by State Public Works Department.

See also 
 Howrah Bridge
 Vidyasagar Setu
 Coronation Bridge

References 

Bridges in West Bengal
Road bridges in India